Daryle Hadley Busch (March 30, 1928  –  May 19, 2021) was an American inorganic chemist.

A native of Carterville, Illinois, born in 1928, Busch attended Southern Illinois University and earned a master's and doctorate in chemistry from the University of Illinois. Upon graduation, he began teaching at the Ohio State University. Busch was awarded a Guggenheim fellowship in 1981. He retired from OSU in 1988, a year after he had been appointed to a presidential professorship. Busch then joined the University of Kansas faculty as Roy A. Roberts Distinguished Professor of Chemistry. He was president of the American Chemical Society in 2000.

References

1928 births
2021 deaths
20th-century American chemists
21st-century American chemists
Southern Illinois University alumni
University of Illinois Urbana-Champaign alumni
Ohio State University faculty
University of Kansas faculty
Inorganic chemists
Presidents of the American Chemical Society
People from Carterville, Illinois
Scientists from Illinois